True Story is the second and final studio album by the hip-hop group Terror Squad. It includes the single "Lean Back", which reached number 1 on the Billboard Hot 100. The group's line up at recording was Fat Joe, Remy Ma, Armageddon, Prospect and Tony Sunshine. 

The late rappers Big L and Big Pun appear together on the song titled "Bring 'Em Back". Big Pun was originally a member of the group and some of his verses are reprised on this track. The album reached number 7 on the US Billboard 200, selling 90,000 units in its first week.

Jessy Terrero and Raul Conde directed the music video for "Take Me Home" and filmed it at a mansion in Hollywood Hills, Los Angeles.

Track listing 
Credits adapted from the album's liner notes.

Sample credits
 "Nothing's Gonna Stop Me" contains excerpts from "Nothing Can Stop Me", written by Anthony Hester, as performed by Marilyn McCoo and Billy Davis Jr.
 "Yeah, Yeah, Yeah" contains excerpts from "Burning Bridges", written by Lalo Schifrin and Mike Curb, as performed by The Mike Curb Congregation.
 "Hum Drum" contains excerpts from "The Dean and I", written by Laurence Creme and Kevin Godley, as performed by 10cc.
 "Take Me Home" contains excerpts from "If Only for One Night", written by Brenda Russell, as performed by Roberta Flack and Peabo Bryson.
 "Streets of NY" contains interpolations of "The Hardest Thing I've Ever Had to Do", written by Walter Marks.
 "Streets of NY" contains excerpts from "Take Me to Baltimore", written by Ruth Copeland and Dick Wagner, as performed by Ruth Copeland.
 "Bring 'Em Back" contains excerpts from "Ask Billy (They Tell Me)", written by LeRoy Bell and Casey James, as performed by Bell and James.
 "Yes Them to Def" contains interpolations from "Soul Saga", written by Tom Bahler, Ray Brown, and Quincy Jones.

References

2004 albums
Terror Squad (group) albums
Albums produced by Scott Storch
Albums produced by Buckwild
Albums produced by Cool & Dre
Albums produced by Lord Finesse
Albums produced by Scram Jones
Albums produced by DJ Khaled